Lee Dong-Geun (born January 23, 1981) is a South Korean footballer who formerly played for Bucheon SK, Gwangju Sangmu and Daejeon Citizen.

See also
Football in South Korea
List of football clubs in South Korea

References

1981 births
Living people
South Korean footballers
Association football midfielders
Jeju United FC players
Gimcheon Sangmu FC players
Daejeon Hana Citizen FC players